Foki is a rural locality (a selo) and the administrative center of Fokinskoye Rural Settlement, Chaykovsky, Perm Krai, Russia. The population was 3,593 as of 2010. There are 36 streets.

In ХІХ century the village (then known as Bogorodskoe) was part of Bukor-Yurkov volost, Osinsky Uyezd, Perm Governorate.

References 

Rural localities in Chaykovsky urban okrug